The men's marathon event at the 2007 World Championships in Athletics took place on August 25, 2007 in the streets of Osaka, Japan. The weather conditions were difficult, with 28 degrees C (82 °F) and 72 per cent humidity at the start of the race. The temperature rose to 30 degrees C (86 °F) towards the end of the race, and many competitors failed to finish the race.

Medallists

Abbreviations
All times shown are in hours:minutes:seconds

Records

Final ranking

Marathon World Cup

See also
 2007 World Marathon Cup

References
Full results - IAAF.org
Event report - IAAF.org

Marathon
Marathons at the World Athletics Championships
World Championships
Men's marathons
Marathons in Japan